The 1979 German Grand Prix was a Formula One motor race held on 29 July 1979 at the Hockenheimring. The race, contested over 45 laps, was the tenth race of the 1979 Formula One season and was won by Alan Jones, driving a Williams-Ford, with team-mate Clay Regazzoni second and Jacques Laffite third in a Ligier-Ford. This was the second consecutive win for the Williams team, following Regazzoni's triumph at Silverstone two weeks previously.

Jean-Pierre Jabouille had taken pole position in his Renault, but out-braked himself and spun off chasing Jones into the Sachskurve on the seventh lap.  Jones had a leaky rear tire for the last twenty laps of the race, but Regazzoni received orders to stay behind. The one-two finish moved Williams into third place in the Constructors' Championship.

Qualifying

Classification

Championship standings after the race 

Drivers' Championship standings

Constructors' Championship standings

Note: Only the top five positions are included for both sets of standings. Only the best 4 results from the first 7 races and the best 4 results from the last 8 races counted towards the Drivers' Championship. Numbers without parentheses are Championship points; numbers in parentheses are total points scored.

References

German Grand Prix
German Grand Prix
German Grand Prix